Virgilio Viernes Hilario Jr. (born August 11, 1976), professionally known as Jhong Hilario, is a Filipino actor, dancer, television host, and politician. He is part of the Filipino dance group Streetboys. He is currently serving as a councilor of Makati from its 1st district since 2016. He is widely known for his antagonist roles in television; as Gary David in the 2010 remake of Mara Clara (originally portrayed by the late Eruel Tongco from 1992 to 1996 and William Martinez for its movie version), and as Homer "Alakdan" Adlawan in FPJ's Ang Probinsyano. He currently appears as a regular host on ABS-CBN's noontime variety show It's Showtime.

Early life
Hilario was born on August 11, 1976 in Asingan, Pangasinan. He attended primary school at Bangkal Elementary School II in Makati and secondary school at South Eastern College in Pasay from 1991 to 1995. He availed a high school home study program from the Department of Education, Culture and Sports in 1996.

Career

Film and television
Hilario started his career in 1993 as a member of the dance group Streetboys. He made his debut as an actor in 1996.

As an actor, Hilario has acted in movies such as Muro Ami, released in 1999, in which he portrayed Butong; D' Anothers (2005), and Dekada '70 (2002).

Since 2012, Hilario is part of ABS-CBN's noontime show It's Showtime, starting as a judge until he became one of the hosts of the program.

In 2017, he was cast in the series FPJ's Ang Probinsyano as Homer "Alakdan" Adlawan, one of his best known roles. In 2019, he left the series in order to focus on his re-election bid for councilor during the 2019 midterm elections.

In 2021, Hilario was chosen as one of the contestants of the third season of Your Face Face Sounds Familiar. However, after 6 weeks, including a win in the first two weeks, Hilario withdrew from the competition for the safety of his family.

Politics
Hilario decided to run for councilor in the 1st district of Makati under United Nationalist Alliance and Abby Binay's ticket in 2016. In an interview, Hilario credited his father, Virgilio Sr., who served as a councilor for 9 years, as his main inspiration to run for the council seat. He was re-elected in 2019 and in 2022. He was the top vote getter on all the aforementioned elections.

Filmography

Television

Movies

Personal life
Hilario has a daughter named Sarina Oceania, with partner Maia Azores in 2021.

Accolades

Awards and nominations

References

External links

1976 births
Living people
Filipino male television actors
Filipino male dancers
Filipino male comedians
People from Makati
People from Pangasinan
Ilocano people
Metro Manila city and municipal councilors
ABS-CBN personalities
GMA Network personalities
Filipino male film actors
Filipino television variety show hosts
Filipino actor-politicians
United Nationalist Alliance politicians